Henni may refer to:

People
 Henni Forchhammer (1863–1955), Danish educator, feminist and peace activist
 Henni Lehmann (1862–1937), politically and socially active German painter
 Henni Zuël (born 1990), English golfer
 John Henni (1805–1881), Swiss-born Milwaukee Catholic prelate
 Lisa Henni (born 1982), Swedish actress
 Mohamed Henni (born 1989), French YouTuber

Places
 Bou Henni, Algeria
 Henni Hall, part of Saint Francis de Sales Seminary

Species
 Arius henni
 Phenacobrycon henni